Steve Harvey's Big Time Challenge, also known as Steve Harvey's Big Time and Big Time, is a television variety show that aired on the WB Network from 2003 to 2005, hosted by Steve Harvey. In each episode, performers compete for a $10,000 prize.

References

External links 
 

2000s American sketch comedy television series
2000s American stand-up comedy television series
2000s American variety television series
2003 American television series debuts
2005 American television series endings
English-language television shows
The WB original programming
Talent shows
Television series by Warner Bros. Television Studios